The Mbaka or Bwaka language, Ngbaka Ma'bo (also called Gbaka, Ma'bo, Ngbwaka, Ngbaka Limba) is a major Ubangian language spoken by the Mbaka people of CAR and Congo.

It's not clear how distinct the Gilima variety is, or whether it should be considered a separate language. It does have its own ISO 639-3 code.

References

Languages of the Central African Republic
Languages of the Democratic Republic of the Congo
 
Ngbaka languages